The AMF Futsal World Championships (previously called the FIFUSA Futsal World Championships) is the international championships for futsal, the indoor version of football organized by FIFUSA (1971–2002) and AMF (2003–present).

The world championship tournament was held every three years until 2003, and is now played every four years. The first event was held in 1982 in Brazil. The South American teams have won most of the championships, with Colombia and Paraguay as the most successful teams with 3 titles each.

Since 2008, a women's tournament is also held. As of 2017, only three tournaments have been played: the 2008 edition in Spain, the 2013 edition in Colombia and the 2017 edition held once again in Spain.

Results

Men's tournament

Women's tournament

Ranking
* = hosts

Men's tournament

Women's tournament

Comprehensive team results by tournament

Men's tournament
Legend
 — Champions
 — Runners-up
 — Third place
 — Fourth place
QF — Quarterfinals
R2 — Round 2
R1 — Round 1
Q — Qualified for upcoming tournament
 ×  – Did not enter
 — Qualified but withdrew
 ×  – Entered but withdrew
 — Country did not exist or national team was inactive
 — Hosts

general table

Women's tournament
Legend
 — Champions
 — Runners-up
 — Third place
 — Fourth place
QF — Quarterfinals
R1 — Round 1
Q — Qualified for upcoming tournament
 ×  – Did not enter
 — Qualified but withdrew
 — Hosts

References

External links
AMF website
RSSSF.com FIFUSA World Championship

 
International futsal competitions
Futsal, AMF
World cups
Recurring sporting events established in 1982
Quadrennial sporting events